Loggins and Messina was an American rock-pop duo consisting of Kenny Loggins and Jim Messina, who achieved their success in the early to mid-1970s. Among their well-known songs are "Danny's Song", "House at Pooh Corner", and "Your Mama Don't Dance". After selling more than 16 million records and becoming one of the leading musical duos of the 1970s, Loggins and Messina broke up in 1976. Although Messina would find only limited popularity following the breakup, Loggins went on to further success in the 1980s. In 2005 and again in 2009, Loggins and Messina reformed for tours in the United States.

History

Initial career 1971–1976
Jim Messina, formerly of Buffalo Springfield and Poco, was working as an independent record producer for Columbia Records in 1970 when he met Kenny Loggins, a little-known singer/songwriter and guitarist who was signed to ABC-Dunhill as a staff songwriter.

The two recorded a number of Loggins' compositions in Messina's home living room. When Columbia signed Loggins to a six-album contract (with the assistance of Messina), recording began in earnest for Loggins' debut album, with Messina as producer. Messina originally intended to lend his name to the Loggins project only to help introduce the unknown Loggins to Messina's well-established Buffalo Springfield and Poco audiences. However, by the time the album was completed, Messina had contributed so much to the album – in terms of songwriting, arrangement, instrumentation, and vocals – that an "accidental" duo was born.

Their debut album was released November 1971 as Kenny Loggins with Jim Messina Sittin' In. The album's first single release, the Caribbean-flavored "Vahevala" (or "Vahevella" or "Vaheevella"), found top 3 success on Chicago's WCFL on 18 May 1972. "Vahevala" and "Nobody But You" both reached the Hot 100. Although at first the album went unnoticed by radio upon release, it eventually gained traction by autumn 1972, particularly on college campuses, where the pair toured heavily. Loggins' and Messina's harmonies meshed so well that what was begun as a one-off album became an entity unto itself. Audiences regarded the pair as a genuine duo rather than as a solo act with a well-known producer. Instead of just continuing to produce Loggins as a sole performer, they decided to record as a duo – Loggins and Messina.

On March 3, 1973 Loggins and Messina played Carnegie Hall. Ian Dove in the New York Times called it a "near-perfect rock 'n' roll concert".

"When our first album, Sittin' In, came out, we started receiving a lot of excitement about the music and good sales," Messina recalled in 2005. "We had a choice. It was either I now go on and continue to produce him and we do the solo career or we stay together and let this work. For me, I did not desire to go back out on the road. I had had enough of that, and I wanted to produce records. But Clive Davis (then president of the record company) intervened and said, 'You know, I think you'd be making a mistake if you guys didn't take this opportunity. Things like this only happen once in a lifetime. It may merit you sleeping on it overnight and making a decision that will be in your best interest.' He was absolutely correct. Kenny made the decision as well. It delayed his solo career, but it gave him an opportunity, I think, to have one."

Messina assembled The Kenny Loggins Band by summoning old friends, bassist Larry Sims and drummer Merel Bregante, formerly of The Sunshine Company, multireedist Jon Clarke, and violinist/multireedist Al Garth. Famed Grammy-winning keyboardist, songwriter and record producer Michael Omartian played on the debut album, but did not join them on tour, although he played keyboards on the second and third albums. Los Angeles-based session percussionist Milt Holland played on each of the duo's studio albums, but like Omartian, he did not tour with them either.

Over the next four years they produced five more original albums, plus one album of covers of other artists' material, and two live albums. They sold 16 million records and were the most successful duo of the early 1970s, surpassed later in the decade only by Hall & Oates. They charted three top 20 singles from the second and third albums: "Your Mama Don't Dance" (#4), "Thinking of You" (#18), and "My Music" (#16). Their work was covered by other prominent artists, including Lynn Anderson, who recorded "Listen to a Country Song" in 1972 and reached #3 on the charts, and Anne Murray, who reached the U.S. top ten with "Danny's Song" in early 1973 and the U.S. top twenty with "A Love Song" in early 1974. A greatest-hits album, The Best of Friends, was released a year after the duo separated. The later studio albums often found both Loggins and Messina more as two solo artists sharing the same record rather than as a genuine partnership. As both Loggins and Messina noted in 2005, their collaboration eventually became more a competition.

Never really a team of true equals because of the teacher–apprentice nature of their music experience levels, the pair had by early 1976 quietly, amicably parted to pursue solo careers, following the release of Native Sons. Prior to the duo's final tour, Loggins accidentally cut his hand with a craft knife while practicing his wood-carving hobby at home, which required surgery and prevented him from playing guitar for most of their final tour. After a final concert in Hawaii, the duo split and went on to solo careers. Messina found solo success elusive, but Loggins went on to become one of the biggest hit makers of the 1980s.

Reformation
The two reunited in 2005 to choose tracks for an expanded compilation album of singles and album cuts The Best: Sittin' In Again, which proved successful enough for them to embark on tour together. Their successful "Sittin' In Again" tour was launched in mid-2005 and played out the remainder of the year. They also released an album that year of the tour. "Every couple of years we'd talk about it, but I was having too much fun as a solo artist," Loggins said that summer. "It was very rewarding for me, and I wasn't ready to share the reins. I still had a lot of stuff to do on my own, to prove myself and to express myself, in a way that wouldn't have fit in with Loggins and Messina."

The two were pleased enough to consider future Loggins and Messina projects and the two also toured in 2009. "Like most relationships, we were a moment in time," Loggins said. "It's just really fun to be able to go back and celebrate that and just sort of really honor each other as grown men, in a way we never really did back then. We were young and competitive and didn't realize that it wasn't necessarily all about getting your way, but you learn that if you grow up."

Their backing band changed from album to album, with the core members listed below. Many albums featured backing members who were well known in their own right; John Townsend and Ed Sanford, later of the Sanford-Townsend Band ("Smoke from a Distant Fire"), contributed vocals and songwriting to the Native Sons, their final studio album.

Members
Kenny Loggins – vocals, rhythm guitar, acoustic guitar, harmonica 
Jim Messina – vocals, lead guitar, acoustic guitar, mandolin, dobro

Supporting personnel
Al Garth – tenor saxophone, bass clarinet, alto saxophone, violin, recorder, viola, percussion, steel drum and vocals
Jon Clarke – baritone saxophone, English horn, flute, tenor saxophone, soprano saxophone, bass saxophone, bass clarinet, recorder, bass flute, oboe, steel drum and percussion (died in 2005)
Larry Sims – bass and vocals (died in 2014)
Merel Bregante – drums, percussion, timbales and vocals
Milt Holland – percussion (died in 2005)
Michael Omartian – keyboards, percussion and concertina
Vince Denham – flute, bass clarinet, alto, soprano and tenor saxophone
Don Roberts – clarinet, alto flute, alto, baritone, soprano and tenor saxophone
Steve Forman – percussion, vibes
David Paich – keyboards
Dave Wallace – synthesizer
Chris Brooks – koto
Michel Rubini – keyboards
Richard Greene – violin, mandolin, mandocello
Rusty Young – dobro (died in 2021)
Vince Charles – steel drums
Victor Feldman – percussion

Discography

Studio albums

Live albums

Compilation albums

Charted singles

References

External links
 Official site
 Commentary on Return to Pooh Corner
 

American pop music duos
American soft rock music groups
Folk rock groups from California
Musical groups from Los Angeles
Musical groups established in 1971
Musical groups disestablished in 1976
Musical groups reestablished in 2005
Folk rock duos
Soft rock duos
Male musical duos
Columbia Records artists
Kenny Loggins